Corazón salvaje is a Mexican telenovela produced and broadcast by Telesistema Mexicano (now Televisa) in 1966. It is the second of five screen adaptations of the novel of the same name by Caridad Bravo Adams. This telenovela starred singer Julissa while the 1977 production starred singer Angélica María who had previously had the role of Mónica in the 1968 film version. Actor Ernesto Alonso produced both telenovela versions. The role of Juan del Diablo went to Enrique Lizalde who, with Julissa, had previously starred in another Bravo Adams’ story, La mentira.

This was the first starring role of Enrique Álvarez Félix, son of actress María Félix, in the role of the antagonist Renato Duchamp, the legitimate half-brother of Juan del Diablo. It was also the second time Jacqueline Andere (in the role of Aimée, Monica's sister) co-starred with Enrique Lizalde, both being stage actors.

Cast
 Julissa as Mónica Molinar
 Enrique Lizalde as Juan "del Diablo""
 Jacqueline Andere as Aimée Molinar
 Enrique Álvarez Félix as Renato Duchamp
 Miguel Manzano as Noel
 Graciela Nájera
 Beatriz Baz
 Fanny Schiller
 Socorro Avelar as Ana
 Humberto Jiménez Pons
 Fedora Capdevilla as Kuma

See also
 Corazón salvaje
 Juan del Diablo – the Puerto Rican version

Notes

External links
 Corazón salvaje at the telenovela database
 

1966 telenovelas
1960s Mexican television series
1966 Mexican television series debuts
1966 Mexican television series endings
Mexican telenovelas
Spanish-language telenovelas
Televisa telenovelas